In graph theory, a harmonious coloring is a (proper) vertex coloring in which every pair of colors appears on at most one pair of adjacent vertices. It is the opposite of the complete coloring, which instead requires every color pairing to occur at least once.

Every graph has a harmonious coloring, since it suffices to assign every vertex a distinct color; thus .

Some properties of :

where  is the complete -ary tree with 3 levels. (Mitchem 1989)

Harmonious coloring was first proposed by Harary and Plantholt (1982). Still very little is known about it.

See also
 Complete coloring
 Harmonious labeling

External links 
 A Bibliography of Harmonious Colourings and Achromatic Number by Keith Edwards

References 
 
 Jensen, Tommy R.; Toft, Bjarne (1995).  Graph coloring problems.  New York: Wiley-Interscience.  .
 

Graph coloring